Meissa Hampton is an American independent film actress, writer, director and activist. She has published a book of poetry is a contributing writer for the Guardian, and received a Ford Scholarship.  She is currently a Resident Artist at MIT in Cambridge, Massachusetts. Her film projects have screened internationally in festivals and on television. She has received 12 Best Actress awards from domestic and international independent film festivals. She formed One Pair of Shoes Productions to direct and produce A Social Cure, a feature-length documentary about the HIV/AIDS epidemic in South Africa. In 2015 she authored a petition the Screen Actors Guild to address the gender inequities that were fueling sexual harassment and assault in the Entertainment industry. She founded the Actors Alliance for Gender Equity in Media and the website $#!% People say to actresses which provides an anonymous forum for performers to share their stories of harassment and assault in the industry. She has been cited and interviewed about her activism by The Guardian and The Independent. In 2017, after Harvey Weinstein was indicted for sexual assault and rape, she wrote an article for the Guardian.

Early life
Hampton was born in Silver Spring, Maryland. She grew up in Gaithersburg and Rockville, Maryland just north of Washington DC. Her parents are Jean and Norman Hampton. Her Brother is Chris Hampton. Her half-brother is Jonathan Stipkala. She studied classical piano and dance. She was a competitive swimmer medaling at the All-Met Conference for the Maryland/Washington/Virginia region and was a downhill snow skier.  She co-founded an editorial magazine  (the Zoilus”) and was president of her freshman class at Gaithersburg High School. She attended James Madison University and Brooklyn College, where she studied under the Ford Colloquium. She also won an award from the Academy of American Poets for poetry composition, performed slam poetry throughout NYC and published the poetry chapbook “One Pair of Shoes” in 2008. She lived in Paris before returning to New York to continue her theatre studies at Stella Adler Studio of Acting in NYC, then MIT and Harvard University.

Career

Hampton was first seen internationally when she starred in “Should I Stay or Should I Go,” part of VH-1's "Lyrically Speaking" series of short films, which won a ProMax World Gold Award. She co-wrote the Feature Film “Uptown” with her co-star and director. Of her performance in Uptown, The Independent Critic said “Hampton is a revelation. She is stellar as the lost and lonely soul she portrays.”

She worked briefly for New York Women in Film and Television, a non-profit organization promoting women in media with which she is still affiliate.  In 2003 she joined The Screen Actors Guild and also worked as a model.

She was a founding member of The Indies Lab, a collection of NYC artists. She later founded the Urban Artists collective with several colleagues.

She starred in the indie features "Things I Don't Understand," which won Best Narrative Feature at the Indie Spirit awards, and in "Looking for the Jackalope" with Michael Leydon Campbell and Stephen Root. Her subsequent projects were honored in independent film festivals in Bucharest, Montreal and throughout the U.S.

In 2012 she formed the production company “One Pair of Shoes” to direct and produce "A Social Cure," a feature-length documentary shot in South Africa. She also formed the nonprofit company “A Social Cure, Inc.” to develop outreach programs for civic-minded media.

In 2014 she was awarded an Artist's Residency at MIT in Cambridge, Massachusetts, where she works with the Open Documentary Lab, part of the MIT Media Lab.

Activism

In 2014 she began to speak out about the gender inequities in the Media industry. She built a website called $#!% People say to actresses that asks performers to anonymously contribute their stories of harassment and assault in the industry.

In early 2015 Hampton authored a petition to SAG-AFTRA asking them to form a targeted committee that could review and address the gender inequities faced by its members including sexual harassment and assault.

She formed the Actors Alliance for Gender Equity in Media with the support of NYWIFT and the intent to promote gender equity issues in the industry. She was interviewed on issues of sexual harassment and assault against performers by the Guardian in an article citing what is known as the “casting couch.” She was the only actress interviewed in that article that was willing to provide her name.

The Membership First Party of SAG-AFTRA offered support to Hampton's efforts, and issued a call to action spearheaded by Rosanna Arquette that cited Hampton's petition and prior efforts

She joined the Women's Media Summit in 2018 where she was asked to head the Legal Action committee with Film Director and activist Maria Giese

Personal life
Hampton has lived in Brooklyn, New York for over 20 years. She has lived in Williamsburg, Brooklyn for over 15 years. She is a single mother with a five-year-old son. She also maintains a residence in Massachusetts north of Cambridge. She has kept dogs named Doah (Shenandoah) and Folly Parker, both Boxers.

Awards and recognitions

 Artist's Residency, Massachusett's Institute for Technology (MIT)
 Ford Scholarship
 Tuch Award for Scholastic achievement
 Academy of American Poets
 Best Lead Actress - Festival of Cinema, NYC 2019
 Best Lead Actress – Austin Independent Film Festival 2018
 Best Lead Actress Nomination – Bucharest ShortCut Cinefest 2018
 Best Supporting Actress - First Run Film Festival 
 Lead Actress Award – IndieFest  
 Lead Actress Award – IndieFest 
 Best Actress – OutHouse Film Festival, LA
 Best Actress – NYC PictureStart Film Festival 
 Best Leading Actress – Judge's award NYC Film Race
 Best Leading Actress – Audience Award NYC Film Race
 Best Actress in a lead – Movie Making Madness, NYC
 Promax World Gold Award – as lead actress in VH1 promo “Should I Stay or Should I go?”

Filmography

Film

References

External links
 

20th-century American actresses
21st-century American actresses
Actresses from Maryland
Actresses from Washington, D.C.
Actresses from New York City
20th-century American women writers
American women film directors
American film actresses
American pianists
Living people
People from Gaithersburg, Maryland
James Madison University alumni
People from Williamsburg, Brooklyn
Film directors from New York City
21st-century American women writers
Brooklyn College alumni
Stella Adler Studio of Acting alumni
Massachusetts Institute of Technology alumni
Harvard University alumni
People from Silver Spring, Maryland
Year of birth missing (living people)